Mário Breška (born 27 December 1979 in Topoľčany) is a Slovak football winger

Career

Early years

Breška played for MFK Topoľčany and FC Nitra without making league appearances.

FK Matador Púchov

In 2001, Breška moved from FC Nitra to FK Matador Púchov. In three years, he made 102 appearances, scoring 11 goals.

Panionios GSS

In 2004, he moved from FK Matador Púchov to Panionios GSS for 250.000 €. He spent three years in Greece having scored 11 goals for the Greek Superleague.

MŠK Žilina

In 2007, he moved to MŠK Žilina for a fee of 250.000 €. Breška finished the season having scored 13 goals.

1. FC Nürnberg

In 2008, he moved to 1. FC Nürnberg for 350.000 €. He played ten games in total for his club in Germany. In 2009, he was loaned to Enosis Neon Paralimni FC. During his spell there, he scored one goal against Alki Larnaca F.C.

APOEL F.C.

He later moved to APOEL FC for a fee of 200.000 €. He scored his first goal against Aris Limassol F.C. During his spell with APOEL, he won the 2009 Cypriot Super Cup and he also appeared in four official group stage matches of the 2009–10 UEFA Champions League.

Olympiakos Volou

In summer 2010, he moved to Olympiakos Volou, joining them on a free transfer from APOEL F.C. He scored his first goal against his former team Panionios GSS. He totally scored eight goals and he made 30 appearances. He also helped his team to qualify for the Europa League for the first time in their history and finish fifth in their league. The next season, he was released, because Olympiakos Volou was relegated to Delta Ethniki for their involvement in the match fixing scandal.

Asteras Tripolis

Later, he moved to Asteras Tripolis F.C. He scored his first goal against Proodeftiki F.C. in a Greek Cup match. He completed the season having made 23 appearances but he did not manage to score any goal in the league.

Panachaiki F.C.

In 2012, he moved to Panachaiki F.C. He scored his first goal for his new club against Vyzas F.C.

Back to Olympiakos Volou

2012-2013 season

On 20 December 2012, he returned to Olympiakos Volou 1937 F.C. He scored his first goal against Doxa Drama F.C. in a 2–0 home win. He completed his first half season having made 31 appearances and having scored 7 goals. In total, he had a very good performance even though his team did not manage to be promoted in Superleague Greece.

2013-2014 season

Breska made his first performance of the 2013–2014 season in Olympiakos's 2–0 home victory against Panachaiki F.C. He scored his first goal of the season in a home 4–1 win against Glyfada F.C. with a powerful shoot. His next goal came against Paniliakos F.C. and his third one against Fostiras F.C. His final match of the calendar year saw him score a goal against Acharnaikos F.C. in a 3–1 home victory. He managed to score one more goal against Glyfada F.C. in a 0–4 away win. His next two goals came in a 0–8 away victory over Vyzas F.C. He also scored against Fostiras F.C. in a 4–0 home win.

Diagoras
On 2015 Breska move to Rhodes to play for Diagoras at the 6th Group for the A Local Championship of Dodecanisos in an effort to get Diagoras back where he belong, the professional categories.

International career
Breška played eight times for the Slovakia.

References

External links 

 

1979 births
Living people
Slovak footballers
Slovakia international footballers
Slovak expatriate footballers
1. FC Nürnberg players
MŠK Púchov players
FC Nitra players
MŠK Žilina players
Panionios F.C. players
Enosis Neon Paralimni FC players
APOEL FC players
Olympiacos Volos F.C. players
Asteras Tripolis F.C. players
Slovak Super Liga players
Super League Greece players
2. Bundesliga players
Cypriot First Division players
Expatriate footballers in Cyprus
Expatriate footballers in Germany
Slovak expatriate sportspeople in Germany
Expatriate footballers in Greece
Sportspeople from Topoľčany
MFK Topvar Topoľčany players
Association football wingers
Panachaiki F.C. players
Diagoras F.C. players
ŠK Svätý Jur players